The third USS Indianapolis (SSN-697), a , was the third ship of the United States Navy to be named for Indianapolis, Indiana. The contract to build her was awarded to the Electric Boat Division of General Dynamics Corporation in Groton, Connecticut, on 24 January 1972 and her keel was laid down on 19 October 1974.  She was launched on 30 July 1977 sponsored by Esther Debra Bray (née Taylor), wife of former Congressman William G. Bray, and commissioned on 5 January 1980.

When Indianapolis was commissioned, many survivors of the cruiser  were present for the official ceremony. The submarine's home port was shifted to Pearl Harbor, Hawaii in 1980, operating out of Pearl Harbor for the remainder of her active service. After the boat's final deployment from April to October 1997, she was awarded the Battle Efficiency E and a Navy Unit Commendation. Both were the first time the submarine had received such awards in her 18-year history.

As a result of the ending of the Cold War and the so-called "Peace Dividend", the boat was inactivated in 1998, only 18 years into her 30-year life.

The sail and other parts of Indianapolis (SSN 697) were dedicated as a memorial at the Indiana Military Museum in Vincennes, Indiana, on June 8, 2019.  Attendees at the commemoration ceremony included former crewmen and officers of the boat.

References
This article includes information collected from the Naval Vessel Register and various press releases.

Ships built in Groton, Connecticut
Los Angeles-class submarines
Cold War submarines of the United States
Indianapolis
Nuclear submarines of the United States Navy
Culture of Indianapolis
1977 ships